Sylviornithidae is an extinct family of flightless birds, known from subfossil bones found in Holocene aged deposits on the Melanesian islands of New Caledonia and Fiji. Traditionally assumed to be within Galliformes, recent phylogenetic studies showcase that they rest outside of the galliform crown-group, making them the most recently lived non-galliform Pangalliformes. For many years it was considered a monotypic family consisting of Sylviornis alone, but recent studies show that Megavitiornis was part of this clade as well.

References

Extinct flightless birds
Late Quaternary prehistoric birds
New Caledonia Holocene fauna
Holocene extinctions
Prehistoric bird families
Galloanserae
Taxa named by Cécile Mourer-Chauviré
Taxa named by Jean-Christophe Balouet